Michele Cinà (born 19 September 1956) is a former Italian male long-distance runner who competed at three edition of the IAAF World Cross Country Championships at senior level (1978, 1980, 1983),

References

External links
 

1956 births
Living people
Italian male long-distance runners
Universiade bronze medalists for Italy
Universiade medalists in athletics (track and field)